Lewis Landes (December 12, 1891 – January 8, 1972) was a US Army Colonel and a lawyer.

Early life
He was born on December 12, 1891, in New York City. He attended the University of Florida where he joined the Florida National Guard where he was sent to capture Pancho Villa.

He married Kathryn G. Levy (1893–1974) also known as "Kitty", around 1913 and had the following children: Sidney W. Landes (1914–2005); Leslie N. Landes (1922–2004) of Rye, New York; and Richard J. Landes (1927-2022 ) who worked for Hewlett Packard and was with David Packard when he was Deputy Secretary of Defense in Washington, DC.

In 1914 he was a member of the Jewish Soldiers and Sailors Passover Committee. During World War I he was with the American Expeditionary Forces and he may have served on the American Jewish Committee. In 1917 at age 26 he was promoted to Colonel. At the end of the war he headed the Allied Reparations Committee.

WGL
The WGL AM radio station first broadcast on January 30, 1927, from the Hotel Majestic, at Central Park West and 72nd Street. The station was owned by the International Broadcasting Corporation. Colonel Lewis Landes was the station president and he stated on the inaugural broadcast: "The International Broadcasting Corporation's aim is to adhere to truth, to be free of partisanship, religious or political." The station remained on the air for only 20 months before it went bankrupt.

Legal career
Colonel Landes defended Eddie August Schneider in 1936, when Eddie returned from Spain where he flew in the Yankee Squadron for the Spanish Loyalists in the Spanish Civil War. 

Landes was held in contempt in a case in the Southern District of New York, a finding which was affirmed on appeal.

Landes also appeared in several cases before the U.S. Supreme Court.

Jockey Club
Around 1940 Colonel Lewis Landes, was asked to act as general counsel pro bono for the Jockeys Community Fund and Guild.

World War II
During World War II he was sent to Australia, where he was the chief aide to Douglas MacArthur and was in charge of logistics and supplies. Most of the troops under his command were African American and in 1944 he wrote:
Automotive Workers Reach Overseas Vehicle Quota Through Overtime. "Work for Victory" and not "wish for victory", is the living slogan in Camp Atterbury's Automotive Section of the Combined Maintenance Branch.  The report fot he month of June is typical.  It simply states: "Quota reached:  Required vehicles reconditioned and shipped overseas."  But behind that simple statement is a story - a story of toil and labor, of sweat and grime, and 12-hour workdays, preceded and followed by long drives to and from work! But here is the story: The Fifth Service Command assigns quotas of vehicles for overseas processing to this station by month or other determined periods of time.  During the month of February the shop went on a 10-hour basis in an attempt to meet those quota figures.  Early in June it was evident that even on a 10-hour schedule the shop would be unable to meet the quota set for the month.  A meeting was held of all employees, at which Col. Lewis Landes, director, Supply Division, spoke to the men indicating the urgency of meeting quota assignment. At this meeting Col. Landes inquired how many could and would work extra hours to meet the quota and immediate response indicated approximately 80 per cent would work any hours necessary. A few days later, a 12-hour work day was inaugurated in all automotive shops, plus Sunday work.  The June quota was met and another vote of loyalty was written. "On behalf of the Commanding Officer, Col. Modisette, and myself, I desire to take this opportunity to express to you our deep appreciation for your splendid cooperation in enabling this Post to meet its quota of overseas vehicles for the month of June, 1944.  To accomplish this you voluntarily agreed to work extra hours each day and nine hours on Sunday. By your efforts you have contributed much to the war effort", said Col. Landes.

Death
The Colonel donated a Greek vase to the Metropolitan Museum of Art. He died on January 8, 1972, at New Rochelle Hospital and was at living 1833 Palmer Avenue in Larchmont, New York.

References

External links
 
Obituary: Leslie N. Landes (1922-2004)

1891 births
1972 deaths
Military personnel from New York City
University of Florida alumni
Lawyers from New York City
20th-century American lawyers